Unnai Kodu Ennai Tharuven is a 2000 Indian Tamil-language war drama film produced by R. B. Choudary of Super Good Films and directed by Kavi Kalidas. It stars Ajith Kumar and Simran, with Parthiban in a guest appearance. The film released on 19 May 2000.

Plot 
Surya has been brought up in the army training barracks in Wellington (Ooty), ever since his mother handed him over as a baby to the camp brigadier. She tells the officer the reason for her action, but the audience is not allowed to hear it at this point. Surya grows up to be a patriotic youth and the best soldier in his class. He is about to complete his training in three months and leave to the border. He falls in love with Indu, the daughter of a senior army officer, who is visiting Wellington Camp. Indu's parents accept her choice of husband, and the family leaves to Kashmir. Soon after, Indu's father dies in a bomb blast, while her mother loses her life on seeing her husband's body. Not wishing to lose her husband too in war, Indu asks Surya to choose between her and the army. Surya then asks the brigadier to advise him, and the brigadier tells the story of his parents. His father, Bomb Sekhar, was a very violent terrorist who was sentenced to three years of prison and death. His mother was a nun who visited prisoners and chanted Bible verses to them. Slowly, Surya's father's nature begins to change, and to near his death; he is completely reformed. Sensing that there is no way for him to repent for his mistakes by serving the nation, he confides to the nun that if he had a child, he would have made him act the country. That night, the nun thinks about her conversation with Sekhar and subsequently resigns her position with the church. The following day the nun convinces Sekhar that she will bear his child as a way to fulfill his dying wish, and they consummate inside the prison secretly. She leaves him, and the next day, his death sentence is executed. Once Surya is born, she hands him to authorities at the military camp and commits suicide as well. So Surya says, his birth was to serve the nation as a soldier, and if she wants to marry him, she must wait for the next 12 years until his service is over. Indu agrees, and Surya moves with his barrack to the border.

Cast

 Ajith Kumar as Surya
 Simran as Indu
 Nassar as Camp Brigadier
 Raghava Lawrence as Ganapathi
 Manivannan as Subramaniyam Singh
 Charle as Surya's friend
 Chinni Jayanth as James, Surya's friend
 Dhamu as Mustafa, Surya's friend
 Ramesh Khanna as Kannayiram
 Pandu as Selvam
 Kitty as Indu's father
 Fathima Babu as Indu's mother
 Babilona as Prostitute 
Guest Appearances
 Parthiban as Bomb Sekar, Surya's father 
 Sukanya as Surya's mother

Production
Noted army general Major Ravi played a significant role in assisting the team during scenes featuring Ajith in the Indian army.

Soundtrack
The film's score and soundtrack was composed by S. A. Rajkumar. The song "Unnai Kodu Ennai Tharuven" is based on "Komma Komma" from Nuvvu Vasthavani.

Reception
Malathi Rangarajan from The Hindu mentioned that "potholes in the screenplay prove irksome" and that "the thin thread of patriotism woven throughout the film, hardly makes an impact". Tamil Star Online wrote, "In spite of good acting by Ajith, Simran and Parthiban, exotic locales, catchy tunes and impressive choreography [Unnai Kodu Ennai Tharuven] falls way short of expectations. And the blame should fall squarely on the story and script writer Kavi Kalidas". The film was commercially unsuccessful, and Ajith mentioned that the shoot coincided with his marriage preparations and thus he found it difficult to invest to the project.

References

External links
 

2000 directorial debut films
2000 films
2000s Tamil-language films
2000s war drama films
Films scored by S. A. Rajkumar
Films shot in Ooty
Indian Army in films
Indian war drama films
Super Good Films films